Nedelcu may refer to:

Cristina Nedelcu
Diego Nedelcu
Dragoș Nedelcu
Florentina Nedelcu
Leonida Nedelcu
Romeo Nedelcu
Ruxandra Nedelcu

Nedelcu, a depopulated village in Mărașu Commune, Brăila County, Romania 

Romanian-language surnames
Former populated places in Romania